Valerie is an unincorporated community in Riverside County, California, United States.

References

Unincorporated communities in Riverside County, California
Unincorporated communities in California